A Maritime Special Purpose Force (MSPF) was a United States Marine Corps specialized sub-unit of a Marine expeditionary unit (special operations capable) (MEU(SOC)). A MSPF was deployed to give the commanders low profile, two-platoon surgical emplacement in the accessible littoral regions. The MSPF provided the enhanced operational capability and precision skills to complement, enable, and execute selected conventional, maritime special operations. They could also perform operations not resident in traditional amphibious raid companies.

The MSPF provided the MEUs with rapid direct action capabilities. They were also responsible for in extremis hostage rescue (IHR) in urban areas.

A MSPF could not operate independently of its parent MEU(SOC), on which it relies for logistics, intelligence, communications, transportation, and fire support.  However, it was capable of conducting operations with, or in support of the operators of the United States special operations forces.  The MSPF's task organization was often conformed as an addition of the Amphibious Ready Group’s Naval Special Warfare Task Unit detachment.

As of 2013 the term MEU(SOC) is obsolete. Marine expeditionary units (MEU) have since 2012 had a Maritime Raid Force (MRF) built around their Force Reconnaissance detachment.

Organization

The Maritime Special Purpose Force contains a command element, security element, assault element, and support element.  The security element consists of one or more reinforced rifle platoons.  The assault element is organized to conduct on-scene command, assault, security, and support functions.  The support element is organized to conduct reconnaissance and surveillance, sniper control and support, counter-intelligence, human intelligence (HUMINT), signals intelligence/electronic warfare (SIGINT/EW), and close air support.

Command Element
The commander of the MSPF is designated by the MEU(SOC) commander.  Command and control remains with the MEU(SOC) Commander.
Commander, MSPF
Team(s), Communications Detachment
Team(s), Human Exploitation Team (HET)
Team(s), Medical Section
Team(s), Intelligence section from MEU(SOC)

Security Element
The security element is normally structured around a platoon provided by the Battalion Landing Team (BLT) and may be augmented by the Naval Special Warfare Task Units (NSWTU) embarked within the Amphibious Ready Group.  The security element will act as a reinforcing unit, a support unit, a diversionary unit, or an extraction unit.
Rifle Platoon (-) (reinforced)
Sea, Air, and Land (SEAL) Strike Platoon, NSWTU, Amphibious Squadron (PHIBRON) (as required)
Special boat teams Strike Platoon, part of NSWTU, Amphibious Squadron (support element).

Assault Element (AE)
The AE is the main effort of the MSPF and is organized to perform assault, explosive breaching, internal security, and sniper functions. The assault function will normally be executed by the Force Recon detachment. Mission-specific augmentation (e.g., additional sniper support, specialized demolitions, explosive ordnance disposal, signals intelligence/electronic warfare (SIGINT/EW), etc.) will be provided from other MEU(SOC) assets or from the NSWTU embarked with the ARG.
Detachment, Force Recon Direct Action Platoon (DAP)
Team(s), Security, Fleet Antiterrorism Security Team (FAST) Company
Team, Explosives Ordnance Disposal (EOD) Detachment
Team(s), Combat Photo Detachment

Reconnaissance and Surveillance Element (R&S)
The Reconnaissance and Surveillance Element normally consists of the Scout Sniper Platoon from the Battalion Landing Team.
Team(s), Scout Sniper Platoon
Team(s), Radio Reconnaissance Team (Signals Intelligence)

NOTE:  The Maritime Special Purpose Force are no longer active and have been replaced with the Maritime Raid Force (MRF). The MRF specializes in operations conducted on structures in or near bodies of water. They utilize speed and stealth to take enemy forces by surprise and secure their target.  In order to counter the growing threat of piracy, the MEU created the MRF.

Support Element
The support element normally is composed of assets from the BLT Reconnaissance Platoon coupled with elements of the Aviation Combat Element (ACE), Radio Battalion Detachment, Communications Detachment, and HET assets from the MEU(SOC) CE. Additional capability may be provided by the NSWTU embarked with the Amphibious Ready Group.
Team(s), Reconnaissance
Team(s), Communications Detachment
Team(s), Radio Battalion Detachment
Team(s), HET Detachment
NSWTU, PHIBRON (as required)
Aviation Support Element
The aviation support element is a task organized portion of the Marine Air-Ground Task Force's MEU Aviation Combat Element.  They are capable of precise night vision flying and navigation, various insertion/extraction means and forward arming and refueling point operations.  The specific structure of the aviation support element will vary depending on the lift requirements and distance to the crisis site.

References

External links
 

Marine expeditionary units of the United States Marine Corps